Tasgius is a genus of large rove beetles in the family Staphylinidae. There are at least 20 described species in Tasgius.

Species
These 25 species belong to the genus Tasgius:

 Tasgius arrowi (J.Muller, 1932) g
 Tasgius ater (Gravenhorst, 1802) g b
 Tasgius atronitidus (Reitter, 1909) g
 Tasgius bellicosus (Fairmaire, 1855) g
 Tasgius bulgaricus (Coiffait, 1971) g
 Tasgius falcifer (Nordmann, 1837) g
 Tasgius globulifer (Geoffroy, 1785) g
 Tasgius herculeanus (Coiffait, 1964) g
 Tasgius lusitanicus (J.Muller, 1943) g
 Tasgius maderae (Jarrige, 1943) g
 Tasgius melanarius (Heer, 1839) b
 Tasgius messor (Nordmann, 1837) g
 Tasgius minax (Mulsant & Rey, 1861) g
 Tasgius morsitans (Rossi, 1790) g
 Tasgius nigrinus (P.Lucas, 1846) g
 Tasgius olympicus (Baudi, 1857) g
 Tasgius pedator (Gravenhorst, 1802) g
 Tasgius peyerimhoffi (J.Muller, 1926) g
 Tasgius planipennis (Aube, 1842) g
 Tasgius pliginskii (Bernhauer, 1915) g
 Tasgius praetorius Bernhauer, 1915 c g
 Tasgius rubripennis (Reiche & Saulcy, 1856) g
 Tasgius solskyi (Fauvel, 1875) g
 Tasgius tricinctus (Aragona, 1830) g
 Tasgius winkleri (Bernhauer, 1906) g b

Data sources: i = ITIS, c = Catalogue of Life, g = GBIF, b = Bugguide.net

References

Further reading

External links

 

Staphylininae